Humbert V de Beaujeu (1198 – mid 1250) was Constable of France (1240) under King Louis IX. He was maternal grandson of Baldwin V, Count of Hainaut and nephew of Isabelle of Hainaut, queen consort of king Philip II of France. He married Marguerite de Baugé in 1219 and had six children. He participated in the Albigensian Crusade under king Louis VIII of France. In 1226, he was made royal governor of Languedoc, which had been added to royal domain. In 1232 he went to Constantinople to visit his nephew, the Latin Emperor  Baldwin II of Courtenay. In 1248, he embarked on the Seventh Crusade to Egypt and laid siege to the city of Mansoura. In Mansoura, the king's younger brother, Robert I, Count of Artois, died on February 8, 1250. After leaving Egypt, he died in Syria sometime between May 21 and August 1, 1250 (sources differ).

References
Testaments de Guichard III (Guichard IV) et d'Humbert IV (Humbert V) de Beaujeu. sur Google Livres, M.C. Guigue, 1857.
Marie-Claude Guigue, Topographie historique du département de l'Ain, Bourg-en-Bresse et Lyon, A. Brun, 1873, p. 226 disponible en ligne sur Gallica [archive].
Elle lui portera à cette occasion le château de Miribel, Marie-Claude Guigue, Topographie historique du département de l'Ain, Bourg-en-Bresse et Lyon, A. Brun, 1873, p. 234 disponible en ligne sur Gallica [archive]

1198 births
1250 deaths
Constables of France
People of the Albigensian Crusade
Christians of the Seventh Crusade